Victor Jigmalm (born February 2, 1992) is a Swedish professional ice hockey player who currently plays for Linköpings HC in the Swedish Elitserien.

References

External links

1992 births
Living people
Linköping HC players
Swedish ice hockey left wingers
Sportspeople from Linköping
Sportspeople from Östergötland County